The Qare'a (disposable) rocket launcher is an Iranian lightweight composite material disposable rocket launcher which has been designed in order to target fortifications. Qare'a rocket launcher, made by IRGC was unveil on June, 28, 2020 beside 2 other domestically-manufactured military equipment.

According to Tasnim, (general) Ali Koohestani, the head of "the Self-Sufficiency Jihad Organization" of the Islamic Revolution Guards Corps Ground Force, mentioned that Qare'a is a 8-kilogram launcher, applied by technology of soft launching ... the missile is ejected non-explosively. This disposable rocket launcher is in an 80mm caliber version and the effective range of this disposable rocket-launcher is approximately 250 meters.

See also 
 Nazir rocket launcher (robot)

References

Weapons of Iran
Rocket launchers